Crinum americanum is an aquatic angiosperm native to North America from Texas to South Carolina, as well as Mexico, Cuba, Jamaica and the Cayman Islands. Common names for this species include Florida swamp-lily, string lily, and southern swamp crinum. The species grows in small groups in still water habitats.

Crinum species are now members of the family Amaryllidaceae, subfamily Amaryllidoideae; they were formerly placed in the family Liliaceae.  They are monocots with six flower petals in white at approximately 10 cm across.

References

http://www.wildflower.org/plants/result.php?id_plant=CRAM2
http://www.wildflower.org/gallery/result.php?id_image=707

americanum
Flora of Texas
Flora of the Southeastern United States
Flora of the Caribbean
Flora of Mexico
Plants described in 1753
Taxa named by Carl Linnaeus
Flora without expected TNC conservation status